Who Goes There? is a collection of science fiction stories by American writer John W. Campbell Jr. It was published in 1948 by Shasta Publishers in an edition of 3,000 copies, of which 200 were signed by Campbell.  The 1951 film The Thing from Another World, and 1982 version The Thing by  John Carpenter, are based on the title story. The stories originally appeared in the magazine Astounding SF under Campbell's pseudonym Don A. Stuart.

Contents
 "Who Goes There?"
 "Blindness"
 "Frictional Losses"
 "Dead Knowledge"
 "Elimination"
 "Twilight"
 "Night"

Reception
Astounding reviewer P. Schuyler Miller praised the stories as providing "powerful and lasting stimulation to the imagination."

References

Sources
 
 
 

1948 short story collections
Science fiction short story collections
The Thing (franchise)